Phostria mapetalis is a moth in the family Crambidae. It was described by Schaus in 1912. It is found in Costa Rica and Honduras.

References

Phostria
Moths described in 1912
Moths of Central America